Mount Bradley is a summit in Siskiyou County, California, in the United States.

Though it is entirely surrounded by private land, the summit, which is the site of Forest Service lookout tower, can be reached by way of the Castle Lake Trail.

References

Mountains of Siskiyou County, California
Mountains of Northern California